Zimbabwe competed at the 1980 Summer Olympics in the Soviet Union capital, Moscow.  The nation, previously known as Rhodesia, had competed at three Games under that name. 42 competitors, 23 men and 19 women, took part in 30 events in 10 sports.

Medalists

Gold
 Arlene Boxall, Sarah English, Maureen George, Ann Grant, Susan Huggett, Patricia McKillop, Brenda Phillips, Christine Prinsloo, Sonia Robertson, Anthea Stewart, Helen Volk, Linda Watson, Liz Chase, Sandra Chick, Gillian Cowley and Patricia Davies — Field Hockey, Women's Team Competition

Archery

Zimbabwe was represented by one archer in the Archery at the 1980 Olympics, with him making his only appearance in the Olympics. In the competition David Campbell Milne finished in 34th place outscored four archers.

Men's Individual Competition:
 David Campbell Milne — 2.146 points (→ 34th place)

Athletics

Zimbabwe was represented by five male athletes in the athletics at the 1980 Olympics, Zephaniah Ncube who at the time was 23 competed in his first Olympics.

Kenias Tembo competed in the 10,000 meters in what would be his only Olympics. In his heat, he would finish in 10th place which didn't get him through to the final as the top 4 got through to the final automatically with the next best three getting in.

Zimbabwe entered three in the marathon, with two of them finishing. The youngest of the three, Tapfumaneyi Jonga who would compete at the shorter events in the next Olympics finished the highest as he finished in 51st place with the gap to first place being over thirty-five minutes. Six minutes behind was Abel Nkhoma who was the last runner to finish in the marathon.

Men
Track & road events

Cycling

Three cyclists represented Zimbabwe in 1980.

Individual road race
 David Gillow
 Michael McBeath

Sprint
 John Musa

1000m time trial
 John Musa

Diving

Men's Springboard
 David Parrington
 Preliminary Round — 416.67 points (→ 24th place, did not advance)

Men's Platform
 David Parrington
 Preliminary Round — 356.76 points (→ 22nd place, did not advance)

Hockey

After the boycott the committee sent out invitations for other nations to join the women's competition. Zimbabwe agreed to the invitation and in their only appearance in the Olympic hockey to date, they would take out the gold medal as they shocked the whole world in taking it out. Sport historian Cathy Harris called this result a "fairytale" as the nation wouldn't get another medal until the 2004 Summer Olympics.

Women's Team Competition

Team roster
 Sarah English
 Maureen George
 Ann Grant
 Susan Huggett
 Patricia McKillop
 Brenda Phillips
 Christine Prinsloo
 Sonia Robertson
 Anthea Stewart
 Helen Volk
 Linda Watson
 Liz Chase
 Sandra Chick
 Gillian Cowley
 Patricia Davies

Judo

Sailing

Shooting

Swimming

Men's 100m Freestyle
 Guy Goosen
 Heats — 52.87 (→ did not advance)

Men's 200m Freestyle
 Guy Goosen
 Heats — 1:56.88 (→ did not advance)

Men's 100m Butterfly
 Guy Goosen
 Heats — 56.15 (→ advance to semi)
 Semi Final — 56.35 (→ 5th place did not advance)

Women's 100m Freestyle
 Lynne Tasker
 Heats — 1:03.36 (→ did not advance)

Women's 100m Breaststroke
 Lynne Tasker
 Heats — 1:18.81 (→ did not advance)

Women's 200m Breaststroke
 Lynne Tasker
 Heats — 2:48.86 (→ did not advance)

Weightlifting

References

External links
Official Olympic Reports
International Olympic Committee results database

Nations at the 1980 Summer Olympics
1980
Olympics